Sedgley Park is a suburban area of Prestwich in Greater Manchester, England. It may also refer to:

 Sedgley Park R.U.F.C., a rugby union club based at Whitefield near Prestwich.
 Sedgley Park Primary School, Prestwich, a primary school in Prestwich.
 Sedgley Park School, Wolverhampton, a former Roman Catholic school.